Torteron is a commune in the Cher department in the Centre-Val de Loire region of France.

Geography

Population

Sights
 The church of St. Pierre and St. Paul, dating from the nineteenth century.
 Some Roman remains.
 The fifteenth-century manorhouse at Milly.
 The seventeenth-century manorhouse at Bertin.

See also
Communes of the Cher department

References

External links

Annuaire Mairie website 

Communes of Cher (department)